The New Zealand Geological Survey Antarctic Expedition (NZGSAE) describes a series of scientific explorations of the continent Antarctica. The expeditions were notably active throughout the 1950s and 1960s.

Features named by the expeditions

1957–1958 expedition 
The 1957–1958 expedition went to the Ross Dependency and named the Borchgrevink Glacier. Other features named include:
 Carter Ridge

 Felsite Island
 Halfway Nunatak
 Hedgehog Island
 Moraine Ridge

1958–1959 expedition 
 Cadwalader Beach
 Cape Hodgson

 Carter Ridge
 Isolation Point
 Mountaineer Range

 Mount Aurora
 Mount Hayward

 Mount Henderson (White Island)
 Mount Bird.

1960–1961 expedition 
 Deverall Island
 Lonewolf Nunataks

1961–1962 expedition 
 Aurora Heights
 The Boil
 Ford Spur
 Graphite Peak
 Half Century Nunatak
 Half Dome Nunatak
 Hump Passage
 Last Cache Nunatak
 Lookout Dome
 Montgomerie Glacier
 Mount Fyfe
 Mount Macdonald
 Snowshoe Pass
 Turret Nunatak

1962–1963 expedition 
 Browning Pass (remapped and named; first mapped by the British Antarctic Expedition, 1910–13)

 Crash Nunatak

1963–1964 expedition 
 Austin Peak
 Banded Peak
 Bravo Hills
 Garden Spur
 Leap Year Glacier
 Lonely One Nunatak
 Mount Fairweather
 Mount Gawn
 Outrider Nunatak
 Sledgers Glacier
 The Tusk

1964–1965 expedition 
 Moody Nunatak
 Mount Gregory
 Mount Hayter
 Turbidite Hill

1965–1966 expedition 
 Hades Terrace

1967–1968 expedition 
 Champness Glacier
 Graduation Ridge

 Dow Peak
 Moawhango Névé
 Ian Peak

1969–1970 expedition 
 Bartlett Bench
 Marble Peak
 Roaring Ridge
 Surprise Spur

See also
New Zealand Antarctic Place-Names Committee

References

New Zealand and the Antarctic
Antarctic expeditions
1957 in Antarctica
1958 in Antarctica
1959 in Antarctica
1963 in Antarctica
1964 in Antarctica
1967 in Antarctica
1968 in Antarctica
1969 in Antarctica
1970 in Antarctica
Expeditions from New Zealand
History of the Ross Dependency